This is a list of football games played by the Netherlands national football team between 2000 and 2009.

Legend

2000

2001

2002

2003

2004

2005

2006

2007

2008

2009

See also
Netherlands national football team results

References

1999–2000 in Dutch football
2000–01 in Dutch football
2000s in the Netherlands
2001–02 in Dutch football
2002–03 in Dutch football
2003–04 in Dutch football
2004–05 in Dutch football
2005–06 in Dutch football
2006–07 in Dutch football
2007–08 in Dutch football
2008–09 in Dutch football
2009–10 in Dutch football
2000